Kavikondala Venkata Rao (Telugu: కవికొండల వెంకటరావు) (20 July 1892 – 4 July 1969) was a Telugu language writer from Andhra Pradesh, India.

Born at Srirangapattanam in East Godavari District he started writing in 1910. Over the next five decades he produced two hundred and plus short stories, two novels (Vijanasadanamu and Inupa kota), hundreds of poems and songs and lyrical ballads. He was popularly known as a poet of nature and dubbed the "Andhra Wordsworth" by his friend and mentor poet-painter, Mr Oswald Couldrey, the principal of Government Arts College, Rajahmundry. Adivi Bapiraju, Damerla Rama Rao, and Kavikondala Venkatarao were good friends of Mr. O. J. Couldrey. Kavikondala started writing poetry in English at age of 16 but Mr. Couldrey encouraged him to write songs in Telugu. He died in Guntur.

External links
https://web.archive.org/web/20080907144606/http://govtcollegerjy.info/aboutus/legends.htm
http://www.bhaavana.net/telusa/apr97/0056.html
https://web.archive.org/web/20090419195150/http://www.oswaldcouldrey.co.uk/

1892 births
1969 deaths
Telugu writers
People from East Godavari district
Writers from Andhra Pradesh
20th-century Indian short story writers
20th-century Indian poets
20th-century Indian composers
Musicians from Andhra Pradesh